The Scroll of Exalted Kingship is a Mandaean religious text. Written as a large illustrated scroll, the text consists of 1,363 lines. The scroll is a commentary on tarmida (junior priest) initiation. Other related texts include The Coronation of the Great Shishlam, also a commentary on the initiation of the tarmida, and the two esoteric texts Alma Rišaia Rabbā (The Great "First World", DC 41) and Alma Rišaia Zuṭa (The Lesser "First World", DC 48).

Manuscripts and translations
An English translation of the text, based on Manuscript 34 of the Drower Collection (commonly abbreviated DC 34), was published by Jorunn Jacobsen Buckley in 1993.

Contents

The beginning of the scroll, from lines 7–227, references 103 prayers in the Qolasta, which are:

a masbuta liturgy (prayers 1–31)
a masiqta liturgy (prayers 32–72)
2 ʿngirta prayers (prayers 73 and 74)
3 prayers of praise (prayers 75–77)
the ʿnianas (prayers 78–103)

The scroll describes what happens in the World of Light (such as being blessed by a certain uthra) for each Qolasta prayer that is recited.

The scroll has an illustrated diagram of a wellspring (bira) with 9 trees emerging out of the wellspring. The wellspring diagram contains the first 6 letters of the Mandaic alphabet (a ࡀ, b ࡁ, g ࡂ, d ࡃ, h ࡄ, u ࡅ), along with 14 sections labeled with the words teacher, crown, wreath, ether, fire, garment, stole, tunic, girdle, mother, father, brother, sister.

Prayer sequence

See also
The Thousand and Twelve Questions

References

External links
Diwan Malkutha 'laitha (Mandaic text from the Mandaean Network)
Diwan Malkutha 'laitha (Mandaic text from the Mandaean Network)

Mandaean texts